Moozhikulam Kacham (also romanised as Mulikkulam Kaccam) was a medieval code of law followed in the Chera Perumal kingdom, south India predominantly in regard to sustaining the authority of the landowners and temple trustees. The code was first formulated in the Moozhikulam Brahmin settlement of central Kerala with royal (Chera) sanction. The head of the Moozhikulam Temple was a member of the Chera Perumal king's permanent council at Kodungallur. The original code has not yet been recovered.

The code, in general, describes the punishments for committing crimes related to temple properties and rituals, like

 Appropriating temple land illegally
 Obstructing or plundering the cultivation of the lands assigned to the routine expenditure of the temple
 Default in temple expenditure

And the common punishments were confiscation of the rights and properties and excommunication.

References 

Hindu law
Contract law
Codes of conduct